Francesco Angelo Facchini (1788–1852) was an Italian naturalist.

1788 births
1852 deaths
19th-century Italian people
Italian naturalists